Braker Sieltief is a river of Lower Saxony, Germany.

The Braker Sieltief springs in the Süder-Frieschenmoor. It is a left tributary of the Weser in Brake.

See also
List of rivers of Lower Saxony

References

Rivers of Lower Saxony
Rivers of Germany